A love-in is a peaceful public gathering focused on meditation, love, music, sex and/or use of recreational drugs. The term was coined by Los Angeles radio comedian Peter Bergman, who also hosted the first such event on Easter, 26 March 1967 in Elysian Park.

The term 
The term love-in has been interpreted in varying manners, but is often connected to protesting local, social or environmental issues. Such protests were often held in opposition to the Vietnam War. As such, love-ins are largely considered a staple of the 1960s hippie counterculture.

More recently the term is occasionally used figuratively to describe a situation in which people shower praise on one another in excess.

Background 
The First Love-in was preceded by the Heavenly Happening, at midnight, on November 16, 1966, on the Sheep Meadow in Central Park, organized by New York Parks Commissioner, Thomas Hoving, and the 'Human Be-In at the Polo Fields in San Francisco's Golden Gate Park on January 14, 1967.

First Love-in on Easter in Elysian Park 
The First Love-in started before dawn. The Los Angeles Free Press promoted the event. 15,000 people crowded in a natural amphitheater in Elysian Park, and listened to the psychedelic rock bands Strawberry Alarm Clock, The Peanut Butter Conspiracy, Clear Light, and the Flamin' Groovies.

1967 New York Easter Be-in 
The New York Easter 1967 be-in was organized by Jim Fouratt an actor, Paul Williams editor of Crawdaddy! magazine, Susan Hartnett head of the Experiments in Art and Technology organization and Chilean poet and playwright Claudio Badal.

References

External links 
 Sulfiati Magnuson. (1967) Elysian Park Love-In - Getty Images
 Michael Ochs. (1967) Elysian Park Love-In - Getty Images

Hippie movement
Anti-war movement
Civil disobedience
Counterculture of the 1960s
Drug culture
Environmental movements
Love
Meditation
Nonviolence
Nonviolent resistance movements
Opposition to United States involvement in the Vietnam War
Protest tactics
Recurring events established in 1967